H class or Class H may refer to:

Railway locomotives
 Barry Railway Class H,  0-8-2T tank locomotives
 NZR H class, steam locomotives used by the New Zealand Railways Department
 Metropolitan Railway H Class, 4-4-4T steam locomotives
 Palestine Railways H class, steam locomotives
 SECR H class, 0-4-4T locomotives designed by Harry Wainwright
 Taff Vale Railway H class, 3 0-6-0T steam tank locomotives
 Victorian Railways H class, 4-8-4 steam locomotives used in Australia
 Victorian Railways H class (diesel), diesel locomotives
 WAGR H class, steam locomotives
 WAGR H class (diesel), diesel electric locomotives

Trams
 H type Adelaide tram
 Sydney H-Class Tram

Ship types
 H-class destroyer, British destroyer class which served during World War II
 H-class battleship proposals, multiple planned, but cancelled, German battleship classes during World War II
 H-class lifeboat, RNLI hovercraft lifeboats
 H-class submarine (disambiguation), multiple classes

Other uses
 H-class blimp, observation airships built for the U.S. Navy
 Class H, a class of electronic amplifiers

See also
 H (disambiguation)